Randall Bruce Meyers (born 1955) is an American  composer who has worked on music for films including Scrooged (1988), Stuart Little 2 (2002) and Drugstore Cowboy (1989).

Meyers resides alternately in Oslo and in Spoleto, Italy.

He studied at the Guildhall School of Music and Drama in London from 1970 to 1974 and at the University for Music and Drama, Vienna from 1975 to 1979.

Filmography

1986: Zinoberveien (short)
1989: A Handful of Time
1989: The Littlest Viking
1989: Den nye kapellanen (short)
1990: Dagens Donna
1990: Herman
1990: Svampe
1991: Hvitsymre i utslåtten (short)
1992: Bat Wings
1993: The Last Lieutenant
1993: Michael Laudrup: A Football Player (documentary)
1993: The Telegraphist
1995: Shut Up and Listen!
1996: Virgins of Riga
1998: Huset på Kampen (short)
1998: I Weekend
1999: Bak Sofies verden (TV short documentary)
1999: Kongen som ville ha mer enn en krone (short)
1999: Sophie's World
2000: Beyond
2000: The Diver
2000: Odd Little Man
2000: Sofies verden (TV mini-series)
2003: Zenith (short)
2004: Andreaskorset
2004: The Universe: Cosmology Quest (TV movie documentary, also directed)
2009: Palazzo Massacre (short)

References

External links
 Randall Meyers website

1955 births
American film score composers
American male film score composers
American expatriates in the United Kingdom
American expatriates in Austria
American expatriates in Norway
American expatriates in Italy
Alumni of the Guildhall School of Music and Drama
Living people